The Finnish National Time Trial Championships have been held since 1999.

Men

Women

See also
Finnish National Road Race Championships
National Road Cycling Championships

References

National road cycling championships
Cycle races in Finland
Recurring sporting events established in 1999
1999 establishments in Finland
National championships in Finland